Stelis asperrima is a species of orchid plant native to Bolivia.

References 

asperrima
Flora of Bolivia
Plants described in 2001